Itlu Sravani Subramanyam ( Regards, Sravani and Subramanyam) is a 2001 Indian Telugu-language romantic drama film written and directed by Puri Jagannadh. This film stars Ravi Teja, Tanu Roy and Sheen (the latter two make their debut). The plot follows two strangers who desire to unite following a suicide attempt. The music was composed by Chakri with cinematography by K. Dutt and editing by Marthand K. Venkatesh.

The film released on 14 September 2001 and was successful at the box office. Jagannadh won Nandi Award for Best Story Writer for the film. It is remade in Tamil as Thavam.

Plot
Sravani and Subramanyam are strangers who meet at the suicide point on Vizag's seashore. Before attempting the suicide, they tell each other the reason of ending their lives and duly write suicide notes. Sravani's relatives-cum-guardians nag her for the ancestral money while Subramanyam is cheated by a friend who took a lump sum of money in a liue of getting a job in Dubai. Sravani and Subramanyam fulfill their last wishes with each other's help. In their attempt to suicide, they consume a high dosage of sleeping pills in Subramanyam's flat. However, the landlord rescues them. Subramanyam lands up with a plum job later while Sravani's relatives take her back to the home. Subramanyam's marriage gets fixed with a girl of his mother's choice, and Sravani's marriage is fixed with her maternal uncle. Sravani and Subramanyam flee from their respective marriage halls independently and unite against all odds.

Cast

Soundtrack
The music was composed by Chakri and released by Aditya Music.

Reception
Griddaluru Goplarao of Zamin Ryot praised Jagannadh's screenplay and direction. He added that Ravi Teja's performance was convincing and supporting cast played their part as well. Idlebrain.com rated the film 3/5 and wrote, "The film starts on an interesting and offbeat note. Due to slow narrative, the film is dragged in some moments. Overall, it is a good film with offbeat storyline."

Awards
 Nandi Award for Best Story Writer - Puri Jagannadh

References

External links
 

2001 films
2000s Telugu-language films
Films directed by Puri Jagannadh
Films scored by Chakri
Telugu films remade in other languages
Films set in Visakhapatnam
Films shot in Visakhapatnam
Films shot in Andhra Pradesh
Films set in Andhra Pradesh
Films about suicide